This is a list of the Davenport Register of Historic Properties in Davenport, Iowa, United States.

The historic preservation movement began in the city of Davenport in the mid-1970s with the renovation of several historic structures. A comprehensive study of the city's neighborhoods, districts and architecture was begun in 1978. The study was conducted in three phases. The first two phases were carried out from 1979 to 1982 and the third phase from 1982 to 1983. The results were published in two volumes. Davenport—Where the Mississippi Runs West reported on the first two phases and Davenport Architecture—Tradition and Transition reported on the third phase. A Multiple Resource nomination was submitted to the National Register of Historic Places that included 12 districts, more than 1,650 buildings on 350 parcels. By March 1985 all the districts and 249 properties were listed on the national register.

The Historic Preservation Commission was established in 1992, and the historic preservation ordinance was passed the same year. Davenport became a Certified Local Government in the state of Iowa. It was now responsible to review local projects participating in state and national preservation programs. It was also able to exercise some control over the modification and/or demolition of historic buildings in the city. The historic preservation ordinance also allowed the establishment of a local register of historic properties. The first four properties were added in 1992. As of 2016, there are 56 properties listed, of which 26 are individually listed on the National Register of Historic Places and 14 are contributing properties in a national historic district on the National Register.

Current listings
The list below contains properties on the Davenport Register of Historic Places in alphabetical order:

See also
National Register of Historic Places listings in Davenport, Iowa

References

 
Davenport, Iowa
Historic sites in Iowa
Locally designated landmarks in the United States